The Barbado River is a river of Mato Grosso state in western Brazil. It is a tributary of the Alegre River, which in turn is a tributary of the Guaporé River.

See also
List of rivers of Mato Grosso

References

Rivers of Mato Grosso